Aviators Stadium may refer to:

 Las Vegas Ballpark, Las Vegas, Nevada
 Fairgrounds Field, Robstown, Texas